Kraskovo is the name of several inhabited localities in Russia.

Kraskovo, Moscow Oblast, a suburban (dacha) settlement in Lyuberetsky District of Moscow Oblast